Doğan Can Davas (born 22 August 1997), is a Turkish professional footballer who plays as a midfielder for Giresunspor.

Professional career
Davas is a youth product of the youth academy of Uzunköprüspor and Galatasaray. He began his senior career on loan with Erbaaspor in the TFF Third League on 25 January 2017. After a strong start with 9 goals in 19 appearances, he moved to Çorum Belediyespor on 29 June 2017 on loan for the 2017–18 season. On 28 June 2018, he moved to Bandırmaspor in the TFF Second League. He stayed with Bandırmaspor permanently after his loan and helped them earn promotion to the TFF First League. After 3 more full seasons with the club, he transferred to newly promoted Giresunspor in the Süper Lig. He made his professional debut with Adana Demirspor in a 2–3 Süper Lig loss on 7 August 2022.

Personal life
Davas' father, Erkan, was a semi-pro footballer who also played for Uzunköprüspor.

References

External links
 
 

1997 births
Living people
Sportspeople from Edirne
Turkish footballers
Turkey youth international footballers
Galatasaray S.K. footballers
Bandırmaspor footballers
Giresunspor footballers
Süper Lig players
TFF First League players
TFF Second League players
TFF Third League players
Association football midfielders